is a train station located in Chūō-ku, Fukuoka. This station's symbol mark is an elephant's head and a flower because it's near the Zoo and Botanical Garden.

Lines

Platforms

Vicinity 
Minami Kōen (South Park)
Fukuoka Municipal Zoo and Botanical Garden
Sun Yat-Sen memorial
West lookout
Fukuoka Teishin Hospital
Kyushu Energy Science museum
Kyushu Electric Power Memorial Gymnasium
Fukuoka Chūō High School
Fukuoka Futaba Junior and Senior High School
Bank of Fukuoka Yakuin branch office
Fukuoka Central Fire Station

External links
 Yakuin-ōdōri Station 

Railway stations in Fukuoka Prefecture